Tvardița (Tvǎrdica) is a town in Taraclia district, Moldova. It was founded following the Russo-Turkish War of 1828–1829 by Bulgarian refugees from Tvarditsa, a town just south of the Balkan Mountains, and the surrounding region. The local Bulgarian population forms part of the larger group of Bessarabian Bulgarians.

Previously a commune, Tvardița was declared a town in 2013.

Notes

External links
 Tvarditsa.com, a website about the commune's Bulgarian population
  Tvarditsa - MD
  Parcani - PMR
 

Cities and towns in Moldova
Taraclia District
Bulgarian communities in Moldova